Jafarabad (also Romanized as Ja‘farābād) is a village in Farim Rural District, Dodangeh District, Sari County, Mazandaran Province, Iran. At the 2006 census, its population was 45, in 12 families.

References 

Populated places in Sari County